{{Infobox school 
| name        = Edison High School
| native_name = 
| logo        =
| motto       = What's Great About Edison High'
| established = 1956
| address     = 50 Boulevard of the Eagles
| city        = Edison
| county      = Middlesex County
| state       = New Jersey
| zipcode     = 08817
| country     = United States
| coordinates =  
| pushpin_map = USA New Jersey Middlesex County#USA New Jersey#USA 
| campus      =
| type        = Public high school
| principal   = Charles K. Ross Sr.
| principal_label1 = Asst. principals 
| principal1  = Joseph FerraraNicole KesselmanAurora Loufek
| enrollment  = 2,223 (as of 2021–22)
| faculty     = 162.4 FTEs
| ratio       = 13.7:1
| us_nces_school_id = 340450003324
| grades      = 9th-12th
| district    = Edison Township Public Schools
| team name   = Eagles
| mascot      = Edgar the Eagle
| colors      =  Scarlet and Vegas Gold
| conference  = Greater Middlesex Conference (general)Big Central Football Conference (football)
| newspaper   = The Eagle's Eye
| yearbook    = Talon
| accreditation = Middle States Association of Colleges and Schools
| website     = 
| footnotes   = 
| picture     = 
}}
Edison High School is a four-year comprehensive public high school located in Edison, in Middlesex County, New Jersey, United States. The school serves students of many diverse cultures, and is part of the Edison Township Public Schools. The other high school in the district is J. P. Stevens High School. The school has been accredited by the Middle States Association of Colleges and Schools Commission on Elementary and Secondary Schools.

Most of the Edison High School students come from either Herbert Hoover Middle School or Thomas Jefferson Middle School, though some come from Woodrow Wilson Middle School.

As of the 2021–22 school year, the school had an enrollment of 2,223 students and 162.4 classroom teachers (on an FTE basis), for a student–teacher ratio of 13.7:1. There were 403 students (18.1% of enrollment) eligible for free lunch and 143 (6.4% of students) eligible for reduced-cost lunch.

History
Edison High School opened in 1956 as the district's first secondary school. By the start of the 1957–58 school year, the school was holding double sessions for students in grades seven through ten. J. P. Stevens High School opened in 1964, as part of an effort to alleviate overcrowding at Edison High School that made it the last school in the district that was still holding double sessions in order to accommodate the volume of students.

Awards, recognition and rankings
The school was the 135th-ranked public high school in New Jersey out of 339 schools statewide in New Jersey Monthly magazine's September 2014 cover story on the state's "Top Public High Schools", using a new ranking methodology. The school had been ranked 174th in the state of 328 schools in 2012, after being ranked 169th in 2010 out of 322 schools listed. The magazine ranked the school 177th in 2008 out of 316 schools. The school was ranked 155th in the magazine's September 2006 issue, which surveyed 316 schools across the state.

 Curriculum 
Edison High School students are required to take four years of English, four years of math, three years of science, three years of history (two of U.S. followed by one of World) and at least two years of a foreign language (selected from Latin, French, Spanish, Mandarin, and starting in 2008, Hindi). In addition, attendance at health and physical education classes are required every year. Starting with the Class of 2008, one year of "Career Education and Consumer, Family and Life Skills" such as Foods or Technology Fundamentals is required as well as a year from the "Visual Performing Arts" such as Chorus, Band, Visual Arts, Clothing for Fashion, and Architectural Drawing. EHS has an Honors college preparatory track that features several Advanced Placement (AP) courses.

 Extracurricular activities 

 Mr. EHS 
Every year, the Student Council hosts Mr. EHS, a beauty pageant, talent show and fund raiser that also searches for the very special and outstanding male who attends Edison High. A month prior to the performance, contestants were required to individually raise money for the affiliated charity such as the Simpson-Baber Foundation for the Autistic (2006) or Buddy Ball (2005). Whichever contestant raises the most money was immediately awarded "Most Charitable." In addition, each year Mr. EHS finalizes with announcements of the winner, Mr. Congeniality, and the amount of money the show raised (approx. $3–5000 per show).

 Choir 
Edison High School is often recognized for its music department. The A cappella Choir and Chamber Singers, for example, have been awarded first place superior ratings in national competitions for over 40 years, 19 under its director, Kenneth Brown (Retired 2021), Now led by Joshua Lisner 

EHS offers nine different choirs:

Concert Choir is the entry-level choir. This choir is open to anyone, regardless of experience or talent level and no audition is required. Concert Choir performs at the annual winter and spring concerts, as well as various community performances throughout the school year.
A Cappella Choir is an audition only mixed choir. The size of this choir usually ranges from about forty to eighty members. In addition to performing at many different events during the school year, the A Cappella Choir competes nationally each spring in Festivals of Music. The choir includes the Chambers Singers too.
Jazz Choir is a smaller mixed choir whose members are taken from the best of the A Cappella Choir. Their repertoire comprises jazz music and they too compete each year in the spring. This choir meets one day per week after school.
Treble Choir is an advanced all female audition only ensemble. This choir meets Wednesday after school and competes nationally each spring with the other competing choirs. Concert choir students are allowed to audition to be in this choir. 
Men's Ensemble is an advanced all-male, audition-only choir. The group meets after school one day a week and also competes nationally.
Chambers Singers is the most advanced ensemble in the choral department. Members are accepted by audition only and the size of the group ranges from ten to twenty students. The group performs at many events throughout the school year and competes nationally each spring. The repertoire of this group includes a wide assortment of musical styles.
The Barbershop Quartet is an all-male group composed of four of the best male singers in the choral program. They compete nationally each year. This group meets one day per week after school.
The Beautyshop Quartet is an all-female group with four of the best female singers in the choral program. They compete nationally each year. This group meets one day per week after school.

 Band 

The band programs in Edison High School are outstanding and also ranked highly in their divisions, with the band placing first in many competitions. Also has different kinds of bands.

Several bands exist at Edison High School:

Director of Bands - Marc DeNicuolo; Assistant Director - Joseph Ciappina

Concert Band: All incoming freshmen are placed in the concert band to help them develop their skills and technique.

Symphonic Band:The Symphonic Band is open to all sophomore, juniors and seniors who wish to further develop their skills and musical knowledge. This band plays more difficult than the Concert Band.

Wind Ensemble:The Wind Ensemble is by audition only and is directed by Marc Denicuolo. The Wind Ensemble plays challenging music and competes in the Region II Concert Band Festival in March every year. In 2005 the Ensemble was ranked 2nd overall in the state for its performance of Yiddish dances. In 2006 the Wind Ensemble received 3rd place in region II and was invited to participate in the New Jersey Concert Band Gala. The Wind Ensemble performs at other festivals as well as on the band's annual spring trip.

Jazz Ensemble: The Jazz Ensemble is the bands' most selective group accepting 16-21 of the school's top jazz musicians. The ensemble plays difficult music and participates in various jazz competitions throughout New Jersey.

Jazz Band: The Jazz Band is open for students to learn how to play the style of jazz. This band rehearses once a week every Wednesday.

Indoor Percussion Ensemble: The Indoor Percussion Ensemble is comprised of drummers and pit percussionists. The ensemble participates in indoor competitions and goes to Wildwood every year for the final championships.

Marching Band: The Eagle Marching Band performs at all varsity football games. The Eagle Marching band took home two state titles in 2002 and 2003 for their shows the rise and fall of rome and medusa which they performed in group IV open. Now in USSBA Group III Open competitions. The Marching Band was undefeated and took home title of first place group III Open at state championships and Northern States Championships in 2006 with their show entitled: Breaking Boundaries: The Saga of the Berlin Wall. In 2007, the Eagle Marching Band took 2nd place at NJ States, 5th place at Northern States and 6th place at Nationals in Baltimore, Maryland. In 2013, they took first place in State as well as National Championships, with their program "Playback".  In 2014, they took first place in State as well as National Championships, with their program "The Grind", and they became the first school in the Edison district to win National championships back to back. In 2018, Edison took home all three banners for USBands Group IV Open competition. They won 1st place in state, regional, and national competitions. In 2020, they took first place, once again becoming State and National champions as a USBands Division 3 Band. In 2022, their show "Chaos Order" made history by bringing them to Bands of America Mid-Atlantic Regional Finals for the first time, winning 7th place at Finals. They also won 1st place in USBands State, NJMBDA State, and USBands National championships.

 Drama 
In March 2005, the drama department performed its production of Crazy for You, a Gershwin musical based on the original Girl Crazy.  Crazy for You was directed by Mr. Harris with Mr. McCaffery as the technical director and Anthony DiDia as music director.

In the Spring of 2006, the school presented a production of Barnum, a show that featured a sideshow before the actual musical began. The play was directed by Mr. Harris, with production by Mr. McCaffery and Music Direction by Anthony DiDIa. Tom Lombardi was the lighting designer for Barnum.

In March 2007, EHS Drama put on a production of Cabaret starring several new additions to the EHS Drama team. The show incorporated songs of both the original and the revival versions. The cast and crew did not receive any Rising Star Award nominations from the Paper Mill Playhouse despite the fantastic two-week run the show had. However, the Kit Kat Girls received honorable mention for their role. The show was directed by Mr. Harris and co-directed by Mrs. Troy, with production by Mr. McCaffery aided by Mr. Scarpa, and Music Direction by Anthony DiDia.

In March 2008, EHS Drama presented a production of Beauty and the Beast, was directed by Kathi Troy and Brian Harris, with production by John Scarpa aided by Mr. McCaffery, and Music Direction by Anthony DiDia.

In March 2009, EHS Drama presented the production of Bye Bye Birdie, a comedy musical. This production was directed by Staci Almquist with Music Direction by Nicholas Kaminski.

In March 2010, EHS Drama presented Little Shop of Horrors, directed by Kathi Tory and Music Directed by Nicholas Kaminski. The production also featured an original orchestration by Nicholas Kaminski.

In January 2011, the EHS Improv Troupe's Jordan Cohen and Michael Fernandes came in 4th place in the state in the STANJ Theater Competition at Rutgers University, marking the first official award for EHS Theater.

In March 2011, EHS Drama presented Hairspray as its spring musical, directed by Kathi Troy and choreographed by Danielle Andriano, with music direction by Nicholas Kaminski.

In December 2011, EHS Drama presented The Complete Works of William Shakespeare (Abridged) as its Fall play. This was EHS's first ever straight play.

In January 2012, the EHS Improv Troupe's Jordan Cohen and Michael Fernandes moved up from their position as 4th in the state in the STANJ Theater Competition and became first in the state. At the same competition the cast of The Complete Works of William Shakespeare (Abridged) competed in the "Scenes" category using their Romeo & Juliet scene and came in fourth in the state. These were both great achievements for the EHS Drama Club.

In April 2012, EHS Drama presented Wedding Singer as its Spring musical, directed by Kathi Troy.

In April 2013, EHS Drama presented Spamalot as its Spring musical, directed by Kathi Troy and Music Directed by Nicholas Kaminski.

In 2014, EHS Drama presented All Shook Up as its Spring musical, directed by Nicole Singer.

In March 2015, EHS Drama presented Urinetown as its Spring musical, directed by Nicole Singer, Music Directed by Chris Curcio, and choreographed by Lyle Dungee.

In December 2018, EHS Drama presented It's A Wonderful Life as its Winter play, directed by Maureen O'Connor.

In March 2019, EHS Drama presented Curtains as its Spring musical, directed by Maureen O'Connor.

In October 2021, EHS Drama presented Arsenic and Old Lace as its Fall play, directed by Maureen O'Connor.

In March 2022, EHS Drama presented Into the Woods as its Spring musical, directed by Maureen O'Connor.

The club Peacock Society, a South Asian club, also puts on a Bollywood themed drama play every year which features musical performances during the play as well. These musical performances include singing and dancing.

Athletics
The Edison High School Eagles compete in the Greater Middlesex Conference, which is comprised of public and private high schools located in the Middlesex County area and operating under the supervision of the New Jersey State Interscholastic Athletic Association (NJSIAA). With 1,490 students in grades 10–12, the school was classified by the NJSIAA for the 2019–20 school year as Group IV for most athletic competition purposes, which included schools with an enrollment of 1,060 to 5,049 students in that grade range. The football team competes in Division 5D of the Big Central Football Conference, which includes 60 public and private high schools in Hunterdon, Middlesex, Somerset, Union and Warren counties, which are broken down into 10 divisions by size and location. The school was classified by the NJSIAA as Group V South for football for 2018–2020.

The school participates as the host school / lead agency for a joint ice hockey team with Metuchen High School and J. P. Stevens High School. The co-op program operates under agreements scheduled to expire at the end of the 2023–24 school year.

Baseball
The baseball team won the Central Jersey Group IV state sectional title in 1969 and won the Group IV championship in 1981 (defeating Hackensack High School in the tournament final), 1982 (vs. Hackensack), 1991 vs. (Morris Knolls High School) and 1993 (vs. West New York Memorial). The 1981 team won the Group IV title with a 4–0 win against Hackensack. The 1982 team defeated Hackensack by a score of 4–0 to win their second consecutive Group IV title and run their season record to 25–3. The Eagles won the GMC Red Division championship and won the 2007 Baseball - North II, Group IV state sectional championship with a 10–4 win versus Westfield High School.

Football
The football team won the Central Jersey Group IV state sectional championship in 1976 and 1991. The 1976 team won the Central Jersey Group IV state sectional title with a 19–0 win against Woodbridge High School in the championship game, avenging a 7–0 loss to Woodbridge in their Thanksgiving Day matchup. The team won its second (and most recent) sectional title in 1991 with a 20–16 win against Middletown High School North in the championship game; the 1991 team earned consideration from the Courier News as one of "the best in GMC history"

Bowling
The girls bowling team won the overall state championship in 1986–1988, 1992 and 2000. The program's five state titles are the fifth-most of any school in the state.

Softball
The softball team won the Group IV state championship in 1987 (defeating Belleville High School in the final round of the tournament), 1990 (vs. Clifton High School) and 1991 (vs. West Milford High School). The 1987 team finished the season with a record of 23-2 after defeating Belleville by a score of 7–0 to win the Group IV title. NJ.com / The Star-Ledger ranked Edison as their number-one softball team in the state in 1987.

Tennis
The girls tennis team won championship of GMCS in 2021 season.

 Notable alumni 

 Gayleatha B. Brown (1947-2013), United States Ambassador to the Republic of Benin.
 Michael Campbell (born 1989), wide receiver who played in the NFL for the New York Jets.
 Rich Gaspari (born 1963), three-time IFBB Mr. Olympia Runner-up (1986, 1987 and 1988) who was inducted into the IFBB Hall of Fame in 2004.
 Omar Maskati (class of 2007), actor known for his roles in Better Call Saul, Unbelievable, and the 2020 movie Evil Eye.
 Patrick McDonnell (born 1956, class of 1974), creator of the daily comic strip Mutts.
 Robert Pastorelli (1954–2004, class of 1972), actor best known for the seven years he played the portly painter Eldin Bernecky on the television series Murphy Brown.
 Walter Perez, weekend morning co-anchor, journalist and weekday reporter for WPVI-TV, the ABC network affiliate in Philadelphia.
 Zach Perez (born 1996), professional soccer player who plays as a defender for USL League One club Richmond Kickers.
 Susan Sarandon (born 1946, class of 1964), Academy Award-winning actress.
 Rick Stromoski (born 1959, class of 1977), artist and creator of the Mullets and Soup to Nutz'' comic strips.

Administration
Core members of the school's administration are:
Charles K. Ross Sr., Principal
Joseph Ferrara, Assistant Principal
Nicole Kesselman, Assistant Principal
Aurora Loufek, Assistant Principal

References

External links 
Official Edison High School Website
Edison Township Public Schools

School Data for the Edison Township Public Schools, National Center for Education Statistics
 Official Edison High School Band Parents Organization
Official HuaXia Edison Chinese School Website
Official Website of Edison High School Football

1956 establishments in New Jersey
Edison, New Jersey
Educational institutions established in 1956
Public high schools in Middlesex County, New Jersey
School buildings completed in 1956